The Twelfth Wisconsin Legislature convened from January 12, 1859, to March 21, 1859, in regular session.

Senators representing odd-numbered districts were newly elected for this session and were serving the first year of a two-year term.  Assembly members were elected to a one-year term.  Assembly members and even-numbered senators were elected in the general election of November 2, 1858.  Senators representing even-numbered districts were serving the second year of their two-year term, having been elected in the general election held on November 3, 1857.

Major events
 March 7, 1859: The United States Supreme Court ruled on the case of Ableman v. Booth, vacating the Wisconsin Supreme Court decision which had attempted to nullify enforcement of the Fugitive Slave Act of 1850 in Wisconsin.
 April 12, 1859: Edward V. Whiton, Chief Justice of the Wisconsin Supreme Court, died in office.
 April 19, 1859: Luther S. Dixon was appointed Chief Justice of the Wisconsin Supreme Court.
 November 8, 1859: Alexander Randall was re-elected as Governor of Wisconsin.

Major legislation

Party summary

Senate summary

Assembly summary

Sessions
 1st Regular session: January 12, 1859 – March 21, 1859

Leaders

Senate leadership
 President of the Senate: Erasmus D. Campbell, Lieutenant Governor
 President pro tempore: Denison Worthington

Assembly leadership
 Speaker of the Assembly: William P. Lyon

Members

Members of the Senate
Members of the Wisconsin Senate for the Twelfth Wisconsin Legislature (30):

Members of the Assembly
Members of the Assembly for the Twelfth Wisconsin Legislature:

Employees

Senate employees
 Chief Clerk: Hiram Bowen
 Assistant Clerk: C. M. Cook
 Engrossing Clerk: A. M. Thomson
 Enrolling Clerk: C. T. Overton
 Transcribing Clerk: G. M. O'Brien
 Sergeant-at-Arms: Asa Kinney
 Assistant Sergeant-at-Arms: Jacob Low
 Postmaster: E. G. Garner
 Post Messenger: Garrit Mahony
 Doorkeeper: D. C. Shelden
 Messengers:
 William W. Worthington
 Dwight Allen

Assembly employees
 Chief Clerk: L. H. D. Crane
 Assistant Clerk: John S. Dean
 Engrossing Clerk: George Burnside
 Enrolling Clerk: George W. Stoner
 Transcribing Clerk: Oliver Gibbs, Jr.
 Sergeant-at-Arms: Emanuel Munk
 Assistant Sergeant-at-Arms: Joseph Gates
 Postmaster: Sewall W. Smith
 Assistant Postmaster: Cyrus Fertig
 Doorkeeper: G. W. Munderloh
 Assistant Doorkeeper: William Adams
 Firemen:
 F. Brown
 N. L. Andrews
 Messengers:
 Cyrus Lanyon
 John Ford
 W. Howard Aldrich (12-year-old son of Assembly member William Aldrich)
 Edward Livingston
 Samuel Fernandez

References

Notes

External links

1859 in Wisconsin
Wisconsin
Wisconsin legislative sessions